This is a list of sportspersons who play the sport of curling, past and present, sorted by nationality. Canadian curlers are further sorted by province.

Andorra
Ana Arce

Australia

Austria

Belarus

Belgium

Brazil

Bulgaria

Canada

Alberta

British Columbia

Manitoba

New Brunswick

Newfoundland and Labrador

Nova Scotia

Nunavut

Ontario

Prince Edward Island

Quebec

Saskatchewan

Yukon/Northwest Territories

Wheelchair curlers

Coaches only
Amy McAninch
Tom Ward (curler)

China

Czech Republic

Denmark

England

Estonia

Finland

France

Germany

Hong Kong
Jason Chang
Ling-Yue Hung
Julie Morrison

Hungary

Ireland
Douglas Dryburgh
Robin Gray (in SCO too)
Johnjo Kenny (John Jo Kenny, John Kenny) (in SCO too)
Peter Wilson
Peter J.D. Wilson (in SCO too)

Israel
Leonid Rivkind (in RUS too)

Italy

Japan

Kazakhstan
Viktor Kim
Aleksandr Orlov (curler) (Alexander, Alexandr) (in RUS too)
Abylaikhan Zhuzbay
Sitora Alliyarova
Angelina Ebauyer

South Korea

Latvia

Lithuania

Netherlands

New Zealand

Norway

Poland

Kasia Selwant

Russia

Scotland

Serbia
Đorđe Nešković

Slovakia

Spain

Sweden

Switzerland

Turkey

Ukraine

United States

Wales

References

External links
Archive of Curlers by Member Association from World Curling Federation

Lists of sportspeople by sport
Curling-related lists